"Hot Stuff" is a song by American singer Donna Summer from her seventh studio album  Bad Girls (1979), produced by English producer Pete Bellotte and Italian producer Giorgio Moroder and released as the lead single from Bad Girls in 1979 through Casablanca Records. Up to that point, Summer had mainly been associated with disco songs but this song also showed a significant rock direction, including a guitar solo by ex-Doobie Brother and Steely Dan guitarist Jeff "Skunk" Baxter. It is the second of four songs by Summer to reach number one on the Billboard Hot 100.

In 2018, a remix by Ralphi Rosario and Erick Ibiza entitled "Hot Stuff 2018" went to number one on the US Dance Club Songs chart.

Reception
Billboard claimed that "Hot Stuff" has a "strong R&B, soulish feel" along with a "fiery" vocal performance from Summer.  Cash Box said that the song "has an exciting newness to its rock/disco sound" with "power guitar chording, interesting synthesizer lines and unusual Summer vocal." Record World called it a "splendid rock disco tune."

Awards and legacy
"Hot Stuff" won Summer the Grammy Award for Best Female Rock Vocal Performance in the inaugural year the award was given out. 

In 2010, the song was ranked No. 104 on Rolling Stones list of "The 500 Greatest Songs of All Time".

Chart performance
"Hot Stuff" was certified Platinum by the RIAA and remained at number one on the Billboard Hot 100 chart for three non-consecutive weeks, and spent the longest time in the top ten in 1979: fourteen weeks. The song also topped the US Dance Club Songs chart, with Summer's follow-up "Bad Girls" as a double A-side. "Hot Stuff" was the seventh biggest song of 1979 in the US. The popular 12" single edition of the song plays the full 6:47 version of the song and then segues into "Bad Girls" 4:55 version.

Weekly charts

Year-end charts

All-time charts

Sales and certifications

The Pussycat Dolls version
American dance troupe The Pussycat Dolls used elements of the song on "Hot Stuff (I Want You Back)", which appears on their 2005 debut album PCD.

EliZe version
Dutch pop singer EliZe released a cover in September 2008, which peaked at no. 11 on the Dutch charts.

Kygo version

On September 18, 2020, Norwegian DJ Kygo released a remixed version of the song.

Background
In a press release, Kygo noted that Summer was one of his favorite artists of all time because of her brilliant catalogue and unmatched vocals. He hopes that this version will continue to bring the joy that the original track has.

Music video
A music video to accompany the release of "Hot Stuff" was first released onto YouTube on September 17, 2020. The video is directed by Bo Webb, starring Outer Banks cast members Madelyn Cline and Chase Stokes. The music video details a blossoming love between the two as they dance the night away amidst blue and purple hues.

Personnel
Credits adapted from Tidal.
Kygo – production
Harold Faltermeyer – songwriting
Keith Forsey – songwriting
Pete Bellotte – songwriter
Randy Merrill – master engineering
Şerban Ghenea – mix engineering

Charts

Weekly charts

Year-end charts

Appearances in other media
Professional wrestler "Hot Stuff" Eddie Gilbert took his ring name from the song, which he also used as his entrance theme.
The song was used in the 1997 film The Full Monty. During a press event on his 50th birthday, Charles, Prince of Wales helped recreate the scene in which the four main characters overhear the song while waiting in line at the unemployment office.
The song is featured in the 2015 film The Martian, during a scene in which Matt Damon's character uses radioactive material to keep warm whilst stranded on Mars.  
Mexican pop star Lorena Herrera covered the song in Spanish renaming it "Algo prendido".
The song is playable in the 2010 game Just Dance 2 and the 2011 game Dance Central 2.
It is heard in a 2022 TV commercial for Applebee's.

See also

List of number-one singles in Australia during the 1970s
List of Top 25 singles for 1979 in Australia
Billboard Year-End Hot 100 singles of 1979
List of Billboard Hot 100 top 10 singles in 1979
List of Billboard Hot 100 number-one singles of 1979
List of Cash Box Top 100 number-one singles of 1979
List of number-one singles of 1979 (Canada)
List of RPM number-one dance singles of 1979
List of number-one singles from 1968 to 1979 (Switzerland)
List of number-one dance singles of 1979 (U.S.)
List of number-one dance singles of 2018 (U.S.)

References

1979 singles
1979 songs
2020 singles
Donna Summer songs
EliZe songs
Kygo songs
Billboard Hot 100 number-one singles
Casablanca Records singles
Sony Music singles
Cashbox number-one singles
Football songs and chants
Grammy Award for Best Female Rock Vocal Performance
Number-one singles in Australia
Number-one singles in Switzerland
Oricon International Singles Chart number-one singles
RPM Top Singles number-one singles
Song recordings produced by Giorgio Moroder
Song recordings produced by Kygo
Song recordings produced by Pete Bellotte
Songs written by Harold Faltermeyer
Songs written by Keith Forsey
Songs written by Pete Bellotte